Lavon may refer to: Godlike

 LaVon (given name), includes list of people with the given name
 Lavon Affair, a failed Israeli false flag on American and British targets in Egypt.
 Lavon, Israel, a community in the Galilee, Israel.
 Lavon, Texas, a suburb of Dallas in Collin County, Texas.
 Lake Lavon, a lake in Texas.
 Pinhas Lavon (1904–1976), Israeli politician

See also
Levon (disambiguation)